"University" is the 32nd episode of the HBO original series The Sopranos and the sixth of the show's third season. The teleplay was written by Terence Winter and Salvatore J. Stabile from a story idea by David Chase, Terence Winter, Todd A. Kessler, Robin Green, and Mitchell Burgess. It was directed by Allen Coulter and originally aired on April 1, 2001.

Starring
 James Gandolfini as Tony Soprano
 Lorraine Bracco as Dr. Jennifer Melfi 
 Edie Falco as Carmela Soprano
 Michael Imperioli as Christopher Moltisanti
 Dominic Chianese as Corrado Soprano, Jr. *
 Steven Van Zandt as Silvio Dante 
 Tony Sirico as Paulie Gualtieri
 Robert Iler as Anthony Soprano, Jr. 
 Jamie-Lynn Sigler as Meadow Soprano
 Drea de Matteo as Adriana La Cerva *
 Aida Turturro as Janice Soprano *
 Federico Castelluccio as Furio Giunta
 Steven R. Schirripa as Bobby Baccalieri
 Joe Pantoliano as Ralph Cifaretto

* = credit only

Guest starring

Synopsis
Meadow and Noah are embracing on her bed in her room at Columbia when her unhappy roommate Caitlin comes back in. Meadow and Noah go to his room instead and they make love; it is her first time. They then try to help Caitlin; Meadow admires Noah's sensitivity. They take her out on her birthday, but an encounter with a deranged homeless woman upsets her again. When Meadow is away, Caitlin persuades Noah to let her hang out in his room. She distracts him while he is working and he is furious and ashamed at the grade he gets: "C-fucking-minus and it's all her fault!" Meadow nervously meets Noah's father; in reply to his question, she says her father is in waste management. She is taken aback when Noah tells her his father has taken out a restraining order against Caitlin. Then, when they are together studying in the library, Noah looks up and quietly tells Meadow he is breaking up with her, accusing her of being "too negative."

At the Bada Bing, Tony is approached by one of the pole dancers, Tracee. She reminds him that he gave her advice about her sick son, and to thank him gives him some date nut bread she has made. Tony explains that this is out of place; also, she is Ralphie's girl. Tracee later approaches him again, telling him she is pregnant by Ralphie and asking for advice; Tony says that for the sake of future generations, she should abort Ralphie's child. Ralphie's manic jokes offend the other mobsters. He is obsessed with the film Gladiator, and roughhouses with Georgie. Things become tense when he finds a length of chain and swings it at Georgie, injuring his eye.

Tracee misses work for three days, claiming to be sick, and stays at home with Ralphie. Silvio goes there, drags her out, and throws her into his car while Ralphie watches through a window, laughing. She later sees Ralphie at the club; he has not been in touch for three days and she insults him in front of the other mobsters. Out in the parking lot, Ralphie soothes her and she tells him she loves him. But he was being facetious, and they have a violent argument. She slaps him. He knocks her to the ground and bashes her head against a metal guardrail, killing her. Tony is furious and, although Ralphie is a made man, physically assaults him.

He speaks obliquely about the event to Dr. Melfi. "Sad when they go so young," he says.

Deceased
Tracee: 20-year-old Bada Bing stripper beaten to death by Ralphie in the parking lot.

Title reference
 Much of the episode revolves around Meadow's university experiences.
 Tracee suffers through the proverbial 'school of hard knocks'.

Other cultural references
 In the first scene, Silvio points to "Yo Yo Ma" as evidence that the Chinese, like his fellow Italians, also have "nicknames."
 After being introduced to Meadow, Noah's father says he sat next to a talkative Tim Daly of Wings fame on his flight from Los Angeles. Noah also mentions that his father did Daly's deal for the short-lived TV series remake of The Fugitive. Daly would later play the role of television writer J.T. Dolan on The Sopranos, beginning with the episode "In Camelot"
 Caitlin talks about seeing the 1932 film Freaks at the student center.
 Caitlin references the Lindbergh kidnapping while expressing to Meadow how she was worried about her missing.
 During a scene in the family kitchen, A.J. wears a Nine Inch Nails Fragility tour T-shirt.
 After dining out with Noah's father, Noah and Meadow see the Francis Ford Coppola film Dementia 13.
 Ralph references Russell Crowe. 
 Ralph watches and disparages Stanley Kubrick's Spartacus, starring Kirk Douglas, which Christopher recommended as a good gladiator film.

Music
 The song played during Tracee's introduction and during the end credits is "Living on a Thin Line", from The Kinks 1984 album, Word of Mouth.
 The song playing in the background during the first scene between Noah and Meadow is "The Dolphin's Cry" by Live.
 When the stripper (Kelly Kole) is trying to get into the VIP room of the Bada Bing, "You Shook Me All Night Long" by AC/DC is playing in the background.
 The song playing when Tracee shows Tony her new braces is Minnie Riperton's "Inside My Love" (1975).
 The song playing when Silvio is informed that Tracee had missed three days of work is "Takin' Care of Business" by Bachman–Turner Overdrive.   
 The song playing in the background when Meadow and Noah have dinner with Noah's father is "Everybody's Jumpin" by The Dave Brubeck Quartet.
 "Powder Your Face with Sunshine" by Dean Martin is used in a scene at the Bada Bing, where Ralph is telling the Custer joke.

Aftermath
According to actress Ariel Kiley, who portrays Tracee, a lot of subscribers canceled their HBO service because of the episode.

Filming locations 
Listed in order of first appearance:

 Satin Dolls in Lodi, New Jersey
 North Caldwell, New Jersey
 Bronx Community College
 Union Square, Manhattan
 Bronx Community College Library
 Little Falls, New Jersey

References

External links
"University" at HBO

The Sopranos (season 3) episodes
2001 American television episodes
Television episodes directed by Allen Coulter
Television episodes written by David Chase
Television episodes written by Terence Winter